Korean House for International Solidarity (KHIS) is a non-profit, non-governmental organisation based in Seoul, South Korea, whose mission is to advocate for human rights issues and democracy, mainly focused on the Asia Pacific region. Founded in 2000, the collective community's activities involve monitoring Korean corporations overseas for human rights violations, attending to problems that arise from multinational corporations, and dealing with obstacles in the path to achieving democracy and human rights.

Goals 
The Korean House for International Solidarity aims to carry out campaigns, educational programmes and research in the spirit of peace and human rights. It also contributes to the improvement of the human rights situation under the ongoing process of economic globalization.

Activities 

The Korean House for International Solidarity has focused on monitoring labour rights within multinational Korean corporations in the Asia Pacific region, and whether the National Human Rights Institution of Korea is abiding by the Paris Principle. The Korean House for International Solidarity monitors the human rights violations and anti-environmental actions of globalised Korean corporations. It also monitors whether these corporations investing overseas respect the local culture and uphold human rights. KHIS cooperates with local organisations in the areas in which Korean multinational corporations are located to achieve its goals. The organisation also monitors the trustworthiness of products made by multi-national corporations, and conducts research on domestic and international standards which multinational corporations should comply with.

Publications 

a. People to People (bi-monthly magazine) 
b. Member's Newsletter

References

Organizations based in Seoul
Human rights organizations based in South Korea